The 1989 Asia Youth Cup (Also known as Beximco Asia Youth Cup for sponsorship reasons) was the 1st edition of ACC Under-19 Cup. 3 teams played in that tournament, India became the champions of this edition.

Group stage

Points table

Matches

Final

References

Asian Cricket Council competitions
International cricket competitions in Bangladesh